The Unanue family of New York City is a wealthy American family of Spanish, and ultimately of Basque, origin. They were the 170th richest family in the United States in 2014 according to Forbes, having a net worth of US$1.1 billion.

The patriarch, Prudencio Unanue Ortiz, migrated from Spain in the 20th century and established Goya Foods, the largest Hispanic-owned food company in the United States. The family's members include Joseph A. Unanue and Andy Unanue. Goya Foods is the 377th largest private American company.

First generation

Prudencio Unanue Ortiz (1886–1976), was the founder of Goya Foods. He was born in Villasana de Mena, in the province of Burgos, in northern Spain. In 1903, at the age of seventeen, Unanue migrated to San Lorenzo, Puerto Rico, in search of employment opportunities and established a small food distribution business. In 1918 he moved on to New York City, to enroll in the Albany Business School, and in 1921 returned to San Lorenzo to marry Carolina Casal de Valdés (1890–1984), from Pontevedra, Galicia, whom he had met there and whose parents had also emigrated from Spain.

The year after their marriage, the Unanues moved to New Jersey, where Don Prudencio, as he was always known in his firm, became a broker for Spanish foods. The company was originally known as Unuaue & Sons and in 1961  it changed to Goya Foods. The couple had four sons, Joseph A., Charles, Francisco and Anthony.

Second generation
 Charles Unanue (1923–????) Charles was born in Puerto Rico. In 1969, he was Chief Operating Officer and Chief Executive Officer of all of the companies, including Goya. However, he was later dismissed.
Joseph A. Unanue (1925–2013) New York-born Joseph Andrew Unanue served as president and CEO of Goya Foods from 1976 until 2004. He had served in the United States Army during World War II, and was awarded the Bronze star for bravery. He married Carmen Ana Casal (b. Puerto Rico) and had four children: Andy, Mimi, Maribel and Mari. He died in June 2013 in Alpine, New Jersey.
Anthony Unanue (1927–1976) Engineer, while in Maryland worked briefly for the federal government. Died in 1976 aged 48. Had six children, the eldest Robert, Tom, Peter and three others.
Francisco Unanue (1931–2002) He founded Goya de Puerto Rico in the 1960s becoming president of that division. He was also a founder of the Spanish Chamber of commerce in New York. Francisco “Frank” Unanue Casal was born on June 17, 1931 in Ridgefield Park, New Jersey and died in Puerto Rico on December 13, 2002 with the funeral held at the Iglesia Santa Teresita in Santurce. He was buried at the Cementerio Porta Coeli in Bayamón. He married Diana Margarita Lopez and had four children, Frankie, Carlos, Anne-Marie, and Jorge.
Augusto Falero Unanue (1911–2000)

Third generation
 Andy Unanue, current Managing Partner of AUA Private Equity Partners and former Chief Operating Officer of Goya Foods since 1999. 
 Joseph F. Unanue (1957-1998) vice president of operations for Goya Foods since 1995. He previously was general manager of Goya de Puerto Rico. He was born in Santurce, Puerto Rico, and had married Isabel Banuchi having  three daughters, Isabel, Sofia and Juliana.
 Carlos Unanue, as of 2013 is president of Goya de Puerto Rico.
 Frank Unanue, as of 2013 is president of Goya operations in Florida.
 Jorge Unanue 
 Robert “Bob” Unanue (1954-), CEO of Goya Foods since 2004. Robert Unanue was born in Wyckoff, New Jersey and the eldest of six children to Anthony Unanue. In 1973 the family moved to Spain for a few years where he assisted his father with an olive oil production business. During this period, he enrolled at the University of Seville. He is married to Muriel Fitzpatrick. Unanue ran operations in Puerto Rico for seven years during the 1980s. 
 Tom Unanue as of 2008 ran the Florida operations for Goya.  
 Peter Unanue, Executive Vice President of Goya Foods.

Politics 
The family supported Michelle Obama in 2012 with MyPlate, an initiative to encourage Hispanics and African Americans to eat balanced meals.

In July 2020, Goya Foods CEO Robert Unanue visited the White House and pledged one million cans of Goya chickpeas to food banks, saying "Americans are truly blessed to have a leader like Donald Trump." The comments sparked some negative reactions and calls for a boycott of Goya Foods, which in turn sparked counter-boycotts in support of Goya.

On 7 December 2020,  CEO Robert Unanue stated that Alexandria Ocasio-Cortez was named "employee of the month" after her boycott call led to a tenfold sales spike.

On January 20, 2021, Goya Foods CEO Robert Unanue claimed on Fox Business that the novel coronavirus was used by the Democratic party, media, and technology elites to control the American public and steal the 2020 US presidential election: “I think this is mission accomplished — mission accomplished by the union, the partnership, the conglomerate of social media, Big Tech, big media, and government, big government — for ushering in the dawn of a new world order, this Great Reset, with an unverified election.” In the same interview, Unanue also claimed that the coronavirus would disappear soon after the inauguration of Joe Biden and that there would soon be a civil war in the United States: “There is a war coming, now that the president is leaving today, there's still coming after the United States, the working class.”

On January 25, 2021, Robert Unanue was censured by Goya's board of directors after he made unfounded public claims about voter fraud during and after the 2020 presidential election. He is not allowed to speak to the press in regards to the politics of the company without permission from the board. The majority of the company's board favored removing Unanue from his position, but the family-owned business regulations did not allow for that.

In February 2021, in a speech given at CPAC, Robert Unanue continued to deny the results of the 2020 election, falsely stating that Trump was "the real, the legitimate, and still the actual president of the United States”. Unanue also stated "We still have faith that the majority of the people in the United States voted for the president," despite Biden defeating Trump by more than 7 million votes.

See also
List of Spanish Americans

References

Families from New York (state)
American people of Spanish descent